Hiloaxmadey is a town in the central Hiran region of Somalia.

References
Hilo Axmadey

Populated places in Hiran, Somalia